Sukharanjan Samaddar (15 January 1938 – 14 April 1971) was a university professor, educationalist, and martyred freedom fighter of the Bangladesh Liberation War.

Early life
Samaddar was born on 15 January 1938 in Eluhar, Banaripara, Barisal, East Bengal, British Raj. He graduated from Baishhari High School in 1952 and from Barisal BM College in 1954. He finished his undergraduate from Calcutta University in 1957 and graduate studies from Dhaka University in 1958 in Sanskrit.

Career
Samaddar joined Gopalganj College in 1958 as Professor of Sanskrit. In 1959 he was appointed lecturer of Sanskrit in Rajshahi University.

Liberation War
Samaddar's wife later stated that on 13 April 1971 the Pakistan army entered Rajshahi University. An injured soldier of East Pakistan Rifles came to his house at midnight. He provided first aid to the soldier who left before daybreak. The next day the Pakistan Army came to his house looking for the injured soldier. The Pakistan army was accompanied by Motiur Rahman, a Bihari and the head of the psychology department, and Ahmed Muhammad Patel, a teacher of geography in the university. The Pakistan army interrogated him and was about to leave when Motiur informed them that Samaddar was a Hindu, at which point Pakistan army picked up Samaddar. Patel told Samaddar's daughter that he was with the Vice-Chancellor Syed Sajjad Hussain and there was nothing to worry about. The whereabouts of Samaddar were not known until after the end of Bangladesh Liberation war. His dead body was found after the war and it was learned that he was executed on the night of his abduction. He was reburied in front of the library of Rajshahi University on 25 February 1972.

References

1938 births
1971 deaths
People from Barisal District
Brojomohun College alumni
University of Calcutta alumni
People killed in the Bangladesh Liberation War